Western mountain greenbul may refer to several species of birds, including:

 Olive-breasted greenbul, found in eastern and central Africa
 Western greenbul, found in west-central Africa

Birds by common name